James William Cammish (21 March 1921 – 16 July 1974) was an English first-class cricketer, who played five matches for Auckland in 1950-51, and twice for Yorkshire in 1954 against Cambridge University and Surrey.

Born in Scarborough, North Yorkshire, England, Cammish was a leg break and googly bowler who took 25 first-class wickets at 31.24, with a best of 6 for 93 for Auckland against Canterbury. He was less successful with the bat, scoring only 31 runs with a best of 7 not out for an average of 4.41.  He also played for Yorkshire's Second XI in 1953 and 1954.

Cammish died in July 1974, aged 53, in Napier, Hawke's Bay, New Zealand.

See also
 List of Auckland representative cricketers

References

External links
Cricinfo Profile

1921 births
1974 deaths
English cricketers
Yorkshire cricketers
Auckland cricketers
Cricketers from Scarborough, North Yorkshire
English cricketers of 1946 to 1968